Joseph J. Huber was a member of the Wisconsin State Assembly during the 1927, 1929 and 1931 sessions. He was a Republican. Huber was born on March 2, 1893.

References

1893 births
Year of death missing
Republican Party members of the Wisconsin State Assembly